Come Sing with Me is a Chinese variety music show, broadcast on Hunan Television. The show is hosted by Wang Han and the singer Han Hong, which invites exceptional renowned singers and ordinary people like fans. Every episode takes about 90 minutes to broadcast. The program's first season has 11 episodes, released on 7 May 2016, while the second season has 12 episodes and released on 29 April 2017. Mandopop folk singer Fei Yu-ching was the host of the final episode of the first season. Come Sing With Me ranked second in the Top 10 Popular China TV Shows in the first half of the year 2016.

The music party show was manufactured and directed by Wang Qin and their team, which was the main program show of Super Girl (超级女声), Super Boy (快乐男声) and Tian Sheng Yi Dui (天声一队) executive producer. The music show was exclusively recorded, copyrighted from KuGou, NetEase Music, and broadened by Mango Television.

Competition rules 

There would be three renowned singers to upload and levy their video for chorus every week of episodes. The audience could participate in the chorus on video via Mango TV and Changba, and could apply online in the platform to participate.

In the first season, the program organizers would inform every renowned singer to choose six persons to arrive at the live party. Those six participators' results on the video to get approval points were score in front of three persons, who would have the opportunity to attend the live competition and chorus with their idols. Renown singers would choose one person to deed as their partnership in the party for the chorus. Every week of episodes, the live party would also appraise the most reception of Hi sing intelligent persons in grassroots and award the music rewards to those participators.

In the second season, the program organizers would inform three renowned singers to choose 100 persons to arrive at the live party. The stage is also prepared and set up an particular area for them. Those one hundred Hi Sing participators conduct as part of the campaign group and interact with their idols at any time. Simultaneously, to coordinate the Hi Sing participators' arrival, program mode has also conducted a new entirely upgrade. They canceled the first season's original 6 in 3 competition rules, supersede from hundred persons interactive, and afterward announce three persons to enter the first round of chorus followed by 3 in 1 of the chorus. Renowned singers from 3 will choose 1 and 1 in 1 partnership chorus. The certain part of competition rules from the first season has remained the same and appraising the most reception of Hi Sing intelligent persons in grassroots part has also been canceled. Every week the live party would set a group of 5 to 6 persons and let renowned singers choose a chorus partner.

List of episodes 
Note: The  color lists indicate the video that will get approval points and was scored in front of 3 persons and enter the first round of the  live chorus. Named in  indicates the person gets elected by renown singers to perform singing in partnership and enter the second round of the live chorus, and the yellow columns  which indicate the singers and participators at most reception of Hi Sing in grassroots.

Season 1

Episode 1 

 A. Broadcast at the end of the programme

Episode 2 

 A. The order of performance is No.2 in second round
 B. The order of performance is No.1 in second round

Episode 3

Episode 4

Episode 5

Episode 6

Episode 7

Episode 8

Episode 9

Episode 10

Episode 11

Season 2

Episode 1

Episode 2

Episode 3

Episode 4

Episode 5

Episode 6

Episode 7

Episode 8

Episode 9

Episode 10

Episode 11 

 A. The order of performance is No.2 in second round
 B. The order of performance is No.3 in second round
 C. The order of performance is No.1 in second round

Episode 12

Season 3

Episode 1 

Episode 2

Controversy

The single episode was enforcement to postpone for broadcasting. 
According to the competition rules arrangement, after every guest ends the second round of the chorus, the live audience would have 10 seconds to give points to whoever deserves the performance. Every group performance by the most reception of Hi sing intelligent persons in grassroots will be decided that week on how many approval points they get. However, the competition quality was violated in SAPPRFT regarding the type of music competition program that management have stipulated, reported by competitor in first season on episode 5. It was enforce postponed for broadcasting until 10:30 p.m. in Beijing time. Hereafter, the program organize have made adjustments to the next show, but wouldn't broadcast the program, while approving points is still remain the same, only some competition quality elemental was removed. Because of this, the program was retrieval until 10:00 p.m. in Beijing time.

Political censorship 
On 8 July 2017, singer Hu Xia performed the first original song title "Those Years," broadcast in episode 11 of the second season. However, as the songwriter "Giddens Ko" have involved "Taiwan independence activists" separatism in the past, song did not pass the censorship, The singer Hu Xia and participator fans on first round of 3 in 1 chorus, and the VCR chorus version was deleted entirely. The song was replaced as "Rush to the Dead Summer." The song title "Those Years," which Hu Xia and 3 Hi Sing participators performed on first round of 3 in 1 chorus that had been broadcast online at NetEase Music before, was also speedily deleted.

Audience ratings 
The audience ratings for this Chinese TV music show:

Season 1 ratings

Season 2 ratings

Season 3 ratings

Awards and nominations

References

External links 
  
 《我想和你唱第一季》芒果TV官方频道 
 《我想和你唱第二季》芒果TV官方频道 
 《我想和你唱》唱吧专题页面 
 《我想和你唱第一季》TVB官方網站

See also 
 I Am a Singer (Chinese TV series)

The vicissitude of variety show 

Chinese reality television series
Chinese music television series
2016 Chinese television series debuts
2017 Chinese television series debuts
Singing competitions
Hunan Broadcasting System original programming